Lamphua was an ancient city and bishopric in Roman Africa and remains a Latin Catholic titular see.

Its present location is Aïn-Foua, in modern Algeria.

History 
Lamphua was important enough in the late Roman province of Numidia to be one of its many suffragan sees, but was to fade.

Titular see 
The diocese was nominally restored in 1933 as a titular bishopric (Curiate Italian name variant Lamfua).

It has had the following incumbents, all of the lowest (episcopal) rank :
 Luigi Cicuttini (1966.09.07 – 1971.01.05)
 Philip Francis Smith, Oblates of Mary Immaculate (O.M.I.) (1972.06.26 – 1980.03.14) as Apostolic Vicar of Jolo (Philippines) (1972.06.26 – 1979.04.11) and Coadjutor Bishop of Cotabato (Philippines) (1979.04.11 – 1979.11.05); later succeeded as Metropolitan Archbishop of Cotabato (1979.11.05 – retired 1998.05.30)
 Sofio Guinto Balce (1980.05.09 – 1988.05.21)
 Gheorghi Ivanov Jovčev (1988.07.06 – 1995.11.13)
 Jacson Damasceno Rodrigues, Redemptorists (C.SS.R.) (1996.12.18 – 1998.03.16)
 Philip Huang Chao-ming (黃兆明) (1998.06.27 – 2001.11.19)
 Francisco González Valer, Sons of the Holy Family of Jesus, Mary and Joseph (S.F.) (2001.12.28 – present), Auxiliary Bishop emeritus of Washington (USA)

See also
Catholic Church in Algeria

References

Source and External links 
 GCatholic, with titular incumbent links

Catholic titular sees in Africa